Stade Municipal is a football stadium in Pétange, in south-western Luxembourg.  It is currently the home stadium of Union Titus Pétange.  The stadium has a capacity of 2,400.

References

External links
CS Pétange - Website

Buildings and structures in Pétange
Municipal, Petange